Botond Kardos (born 16 September 1997) is a Hungarian artistic gymnast.

References 

1997 births
Gymnasts from Budapest
Hungarian male artistic gymnasts
Living people
Gymnasts at the 2014 Summer Youth Olympics
21st-century Hungarian people